Man of the Year is a 1995 mockumentary film written, directed by and starring Dirk Shafer. It is a fictionalized account of Shafer's reign as Playgirl magazine's 1992 "Man of the Year" and his struggle with reconciling his public persona as a sex symbol to women with his identity as a gay man. Shafer combines mock interviews (both with some of the actual people involved and with actors standing in for the actual people) with archive footage from Shafer's appearances on talk shows like Donahue, The Maury Povich Show and The Jerry Springer Show (along with an early appearance on Dance Fever) and recreations of events like his Playgirl photoshoots, his "fantasy date" with a Playgirl reader and the death of his friend Pledge Cartwright (played by actor Bill Brochtrup) of an AIDS-related illness to relate the story.

Critical response
Variety gave Man of the Year a generally favorable review, calling the film "pleasant to watch and intermittently clever." However, it notes that Shafer's writing is "uneven" and that the film's "structure is a bit repetitive." The New Yorker largely concurred, noting that Shafer "keep[s] condescension at bay with some nice comic spins" but finding the use of the death of Shafer's friend as Shafer's catalyst for coming out to be self-serving. The San Francisco Chronicle was far harsher, deriding the film as a "vanity" production and complaining "There's no shape to Man of the Year, no forward movement. Man of the Year doesn't even have the benefit of being hip." The New York Times, however, found the film "gently satirical" with the use of real clips from Shafer's various talk show appearances creating a "tone of vertiginous loopiness." The Times also saw the metaphor in Shafer's experience to the pressure that society put on gay people to pretend to be straight.

DVD release
Man of the Year was released on Region 1 DVD on February 23, 1999.

References

External links
 Man of the Year at Internet Movie Database

1995 films
1995 LGBT-related films
American LGBT-related films
American mockumentary films
HIV/AIDS in American films
Films directed by Dirk Shafer
1990s mockumentary films
1990s English-language films
1990s American films